The People of Simlang Valley (Swedish: Folket i Simlångsdalen) is a 1947 Swedish drama film directed by Åke Ohberg and starring Edvin Adolphson, Eva Dahlbeck and Arthur Fischer. The film's sets were designed by the art director Bibi Lindström. It is based on the 1903 novel The People of Simlang Valley by Fredrik Ström, which had previously been adapted into a 1924 silent film of the same title.

Cast
 Edvin Adolphson as 	Stig Folkesson
 Eva Dahlbeck as 	Ingrid Folkesson
 Arthur Fischer as 	Brand
 Signe Wirff as 	Mrs. Brand
 Kenne Fant as 	Sven Brand
 Barbro Nordin as 	Marit
 Peter Lindgren as 	Tattar-Jan
 Carl Ström as 	Sibelius
 Sven Bergvall as 	Vicar
 Nils Hallberg as 	Häst-Jonke
 Josua Bengtson as 	Klånkan
 Naima Wifstrand as 	Skoga-Börta
 Fylgia Zadig as 	Fia
 Emmy Albiin as Marsgård Farmer's Wife
 Torgny Anderberg as 	Farmhand
 Astrid Bodin as Waitress at the inn
 Harald Emanuelsson as 	Alarik
 David Erikson as Marshall
 Knut Frankman as Eriksson
 Sune Högberg as Accordion Player
 Einar Lindholm as 	Anton Nilsson
 John Melin as 	Customer
 John Norrman as 	Marsgård Farmer
 Birger Sahlberg as 	Peasant at the inn
 Nina Scenna as Malin
 Georg Skarstedt as Bell Ringer
 Ivar Wahlgren as 	Ola
 Tom Walter as 	Gypsy
 Lillie Wästfeldt as 	Maid
 Erik Forslund as Folkesson's farm hand

References

Bibliography 
 Qvist, Per Olov & von Bagh, Peter. Guide to the Cinema of Sweden and Finland. Greenwood Publishing Group, 2000.

External links 
 

1947 films
Swedish drama films
1947 drama films
1940s Swedish-language films
Films directed by Åke Ohberg
Films based on Swedish novels
Remakes of Swedish films
1940s Swedish films